Mardi Cinéma is a French television show and game show devoted to cinema, created and presented by Pierre Tchernia and Jacques Rouland.

Premise

After the screening of the film of the first part of the evening, Pierre Tchernia and Jacques Rouland receive live from the Théâtre de l'Empire, then from the Cognac-Jay studios, two actors and offer reports and trailers. During the show, two teams of people, would answer questions relating to the film, with the help of the guests of the show.

Revival

The show was revived with Laurent Ruquier presenting the show in 2016. The show was cancelled due to low ratings.

References

1982 French television series debuts
1988 French television series endings
2016 French television series debuts
2018 French television series endings
French game shows
French-language television shows